Khalid Raad is a Syrian liberal economist, technocrat and former deputy prime minister, who was in charge of economic affairs.

Career
Raad taught courses at Damascus University. He also headed Syria's Free Zones Authority. He was appointed as deputy prime minister in charge of economic affairs to the cabinet led by Prime Minister Muhammad Mustafa Mero on 13 March 2000, replacing Salim Said Yasin, who had been in office since 1985. Raad's tenure ended on 13 December 2001 and he was replaced by Mohammad Al Hussein as deputy premier.

References

Living people
20th-century Syrian economists
Academic staff of Damascus University
Deputy Prime Ministers of Syria
Year of birth missing (living people)